Events from the year 2013 in Denmark.

Incumbents
 Monarch – Margrethe II
 Prime minister – Helle Thorning Schmidt

Events 
 1 April – The Danish government launches a lockout of all the Danish teachers. The lockout lasts until 26 April.
 28 April – Danish Resistance Museum in Copenhagen burns.
 27–28 October – The St. Jude storm hit Denmark. The storm's max gust speed of  194.4 km/h (120.8 mph) was the highest ever recorded in Denmark.

Culture

Architecture
 29 April – Henning Larsen Architects' Herpa Concert Hall wins the European Union Prize for Contemporary Architecture.
 30 May – Gehl Architects are awarded the Nykredit Architecture Prize at a ceremony in Copenhagen.
 12 June – 3XN's Frederiksberg Courthouse in Copenhagen and Lundgaard & Tranberg's Sorø Art Museum are among the year's nine recipients of RIBA RU Awards from the Royal Institute of British Architects.
 20 September – Henning Larsen Architects win the LEAF Awards for Best Public Building of the Year in the Education & Research and Culture categories for Campus Roskilde and Herpa respectively.

Film

 10 February – Thomas Vinterberg's The Hunt is nominated for Best Film Not in the English Language at the 66th British Academy Film Awards.
 30 October – Thomas Vinterberg's The Hunt wins the Nordic Council Film Prize.
 7 December – 26th European Film Awards
 Susanne Bier's Love Is All You Need wins the award for Best Comedy.
 Copenhagen-based Joshua Oppenheimer's The Act of Killing wins the award for Best Documentary
 9 December – The Hunt wins the award for Best Foreign Independent Film at the British Independent Film Awards 2013.

Literature
 30 October – Kim Leine's The Prophets of Eternal Fjord  wins the Nordic Council's Literature Prize.

Media
 28 January – DR launches DR3.
 4 March – DR launches DR Ultra.

Music
 18 May – Emmelie de Forest wins the 2013 Eurovision Song Contest in Malmö with the song Only Teardrops.

Sport

Badminton
 17 February – Denmark wins silver at the 2013 European Mixed Team Badminton Championships after being defeated by Germany in the final.
 5-10 March – Tine Baun wins gold in Women's Single at 2013 All England Super Series Premier.
 511 August  Denmark wins one silver medal and one bronze medal at the 2013 BWF World Championships.

Cycling
 31 January – Michael Rasmussen admits that he has used performance-enhancing drugs and methods for the most of his professional career.

Football
 5 May – FC Copenhagen wins the 2012–13 Danish Superliga by drawing Brøndby IF 0–0 at Brøndby Stadion.
 9 May – Esbjerg fB wins the 2012–13 Danish Cup by defeating Randers FC 1–0 in the 2013 Danish Cup Final.

Golf
 8 September – Thomas Bjørn wins Omega European Masters on the 2013 European Tour.
 24 November – Morten Ørum Madsen wins South African Open Championship on the 2014 European Tour.
 8 December – Thomas Bjørn wins Nedbank Golf Challenge on the 2014 European Tour.

Handball
 27 January – Denmark wins silver at the 2013 World Men's Handball Championship after being defeated by Spain in the final.

Motorsports
 23 June – Tom Kristensen wins the 2013 24 Hours of Le Mans for the ninth time as part of the Audi Sport Team Joest  team.

Deaths 
 7 February – Peter Steen, actor (born 1936)
 19 March – Holger Juul Hansen, actor (born 1924)
 4 April - Beatrice Palner, film actress (born 1938)
 22 April – Vivi Bak, actress (born 1939)
 20 May – Dr Haldor Topsøe, civil engineer (born 1913)
 21 May – Count Christian of Rosenborg, cousin of the Danish Queen Margrethe II of Denmark (born 1942)
 6 June – Erling Blöndal Bengtsson, cellist (born 1932)
 22 June – Allan Simonsen, racing driver (born 1978)
 22 June – Henning Larsen, architect (born 1925)
 1 September – Ole Ernst, actor (born 1940)
 5 October – Heidi Ryom, dancer (born 1955)
 21 October - Rune T. Kidde, writer, storyteller, musician and artist (born 1957)
 12 November - Kurt Trampedach, painter and sculptor (born 1943)
 22 December – Hans Hækkerup, politician and former Minister of Defense (born 1945)

See also

2013 in Danish television

References

 
Years of the 21st century in Denmark
Denmark
Denmark
2010s in Denmark